Franklin City is an unincorporated community in Accomack County, Virginia, United States.

Greenbackville and neighboring Franklin City grew as a result of the railroad line laid in the late 19th century to transport oysters and other shellfish from Chincoteague to Baltimore, Philadelphia, and New York City.  By the 1870s, the Frankfort and Worcester Railroad reached Snow Hill, Maryland.  In 1876, Maryland judge John R. Franklin, a stockholder in the railroad, was able to get the line extended to land he owned just south of the state line in Virginia.  Later, the New York, Philadelphia and Norfolk Railroad built track the length of the Delmarva Peninsula, reaching Cape Charles in 1884 and joining the Frankfort & Worcester.

Judge Franklin planned and surveyed Franklin City, which was to have three main streets, crossed by five others, and envisioned a town of around 2,000, centered around the railroad.  By 1877, a post office and a hotel were established, joining a general store, and several oyster-packing houses.  Commercial fishermen harvested over a hundred thousand bushels of oysters a year from Chincoteague Bay, bringing much of that harvest to the Franklin City depot, from which it was shipped north by train.  Ferries carried freight and passengers between Franklin City and Chincoteague.  An 1896 fire destroyed many Franklin City buildings; not all were rebuilt.  A series of storms in the 20th century, combined with the opening in 1922 of a bridge and causeway to Chincoteague, threw Franklin City into decline.  The railroad was abandoned in 1955.

After the construction of the Chincoteague Causeway, the Depression and the nor'easter of 1962 continued to erode Franklin City's and Greenbackville's economic base.  Little remains of Franklin City.

References

Unincorporated communities in Virginia
Unincorporated communities in Accomack County, Virginia